Béla Pósa (25 June 1914 – 6 May 1991) was a Hungarian footballer. He played in three matches for the Hungary national football team from 1940 to 1947. He was also part of Hungary's squad for the football tournament at the 1936 Summer Olympics, but he did not play in any matches.

References

External links
 

1914 births
1991 deaths
Hungarian footballers
Hungary international footballers
Footballers from Budapest
Association football defenders
Ferencvárosi TC footballers
Vasas SC players